Gleason's is a boxing gym located on the Brooklyn waterfront. The gym was founded by Peter Gagliardi, a former bantamweight, who changed his name to Bobby Gleason. It moved to Manhattan and then to Brooklyn. Gleason's is now owned by Bruce Silverglade.

There is a sign on the wall at Gleason's, posting an invitation from the poet Virgil: "Now, whoever has courage, and a strong and collected spirit in his breast, let him come forward, lace on the gloves and put up his hands." (Aeneid 5.363-364) Prizefighters have long answered this call at Gleason's and some still do.

There is an illustrated book called At Gleason's Gym. Owner Bruce Silverglade and Gleason's trainer Hector Roca co-authored the book The Gleason's Gym: Total Body Boxing Workout for Women, with a foreword by actor Hilary Swank (she famously thanked Hector Roca when she received her Oscar for her role in the boxing movie "Million Dollar Baby").
There is a book called White Collar Boxing: One Man's Journey from the Office to the Ring, in which John E. Oden describes Gleason's Gym in Chapter 6.

In 2015, part of episode 18, season 4, of the television comedy show "Impractical Jokers" took place at the gym.

The Season 11 premiere of Ink Master filmed the gym which was used as the location where 22 artists competed to earn a spot on Team Cleen or Team Christian by tattooing a subject in one of the coaches' specialties for six hours.

References

External links
 
 Johnny Rodz wrestling school web site
 Wikipedia's Article (in Spanish): "At Gleason's Gym".

Boxing venues in New York City
Boxing gyms in the United States
Professional wrestling schools
1937 establishments in New York City
Sports in Brooklyn
Sports venues in Brooklyn
Dumbo, Brooklyn